The 2008 European Road Championships were held in Stresa, Pettenasco, Arona and Verbania, in the province of Novare and Verbano-Cusio-Ossola, Italy, between 3 July and 6 July 2008. Regulated by the European Cycling Union. The event consisted of a road race and a time trial for men and women under 23 and juniors.

Schedule

Individual time trial 
Thursday 3 July 2008
 09:00 - Women U23, 25.3 km
 11:30 - Men U23, 25.3 km

Friday 4 July 2008
 09:30 - Women Juniors, 16.5 km
 11:00 - Men Juniors, 26.5 km

Road race
Saturday 5 July 2008
 09:00 - Women U23, 129.6 km
 11:30 - Men U23, 151,2 km

Sunday 6 July 2008
 09:00 - Women Juniors, 86.4 km
 11:00 - Men Juniors, 129.6 km

Events summary

Countries
  Netherlands at the 2008 European Road Championships
  Ukraine at the 2008 European Road Championships
incomplete list

Medal table

References

External links
Official website

 
European Road Championships, 2008
Road cycling
European Road Championships by year
International cycle races hosted by Italy